Market Wise (foaled 1938 in Virginia) was an American Champion Thoroughbred racehorse.

Background
Bred by Cary T. Grayson, Market Wise was out of On Hand, and his sire was the 1933 Kentucky Derby winner, Brokers Tip. He was purchased by New York contractor Louis Tufano for $1,000. He was trained by George W. Carroll.

Racing career

1940 & 1941: early career
Market Wise raced in 1940 at age two with little success. Going into the April 26, 1941, Wood Memorial Stakes, the then three-year-old had earned only $4,975, but he upset the favorite, King Cole, to win with a come-from-behind stretch drive. Flush with over $16,000 in winnings from the race, owner Louis Tufano hired a private railcar to transport his horse to Louisville, Kentucky to run in the Derby. Market Wise ran third to winner Whirlaway in the 1941 Kentucky Derby and second to him in the Dwyer Stakes. He later defeated Whirlaway in the 1941 Jockey Club Gold Cup while setting a new American record for two miles. The colt went on to win the Gallant Fox Handicap and on September 6 set a new Aqueduct Racetrack track record in winning the 1⅛ mile Edgemere Handicap. On October 30, 1941, Market Wise earned his most important win of the year in the Pimlico Special under regular jockey Wendell Eads. Two weeks later, on the same Pimlico Race Course, he won the one and five eights mile Governor Bowie Handicap in track-record time. In the balloting for 1941 American Champion Three-Year-Old Male Horse honors, Market Wise finished second to U.S. Triple Crown winner, Whirlaway.

1942: four-year-old season
Sent to Florida for the 1941-1942 winter season, Market Wise finished fourth in the January 1942 Kendall Purse at seven furlongs. Hampered by a foot injury, he then finished third in the Hialeah Stakes. In February 1942, he beat a top field in the important McLennan Handicap at Hialeah Park Race Track. He won again a week later on February 29 and then finished off the board as the heavy favorite in the March 8th Widener Challenge Cup Handicap, the most important race for older horses during the Florida winter season.

Returning north for the summer racing season, Market Wise defeated Whirlaway in the 1942 Suburban Handicap.

1943: five-year-old season
Market Wise raced at age five in 1943. On the way to being voted American Co-Champion Older Male Horse, he won the Massachusetts Handicap and the Narragansett Special. In the Massachusetts Handicap in July, Market Wise carried top weight of 126 pounds and won with an "amazing last-minute burst" in a stakes record of 1:52.6 despite sustaining a "spread foot". Two months later in the Narragansett Special, he produced a powerful late run to catch Air Master in the closing stages, with Thumbs Up third and Shut Out fourth. He returned to the winners' circle limping badly after sustaining a quarter crack.

In December, Market Wise, described as "Mr. Rags to Riches," topped the annual poll of writers and broadcasters conducted by Turf and Sports Digest magazine for the title of American Champion Older Male Horse with 176 points, ahead of Thumbs Up (171), Shut Out (154), and Devil Diver (138). The rival Daily Racing Form award went to Devil Diver.

Stud record
Retired to stud, Market Wise met with modest success as a stallion. In addition to multiple stakes winner Wise Margin, he sired the very speedy To Market, a colt who in 1952 set two track records for 1¼ miles with a time of 2:01.40 in both the Massachusetts Handicap at Suffolk Downs in Boston and the Hawthorne Gold Cup Handicap at Hawthorne Race Course in Chicago. To Market sired Hurry to Market, the 1963 American Co-Champion Two-Year-Old Colt.

Pedigree

References

1938 racehorse births
Racehorses bred in Virginia
Racehorses trained in the United States
American Champion racehorses
Thoroughbred family 22-c